The Colt ACR was Colt's entry in the U.S. DoD Advanced Combat Rifle program, which concluded with the result that none of the entrants achieved enough of an improvement over the M16 to be worth the cost.

The Colt ACR was not a total loss, however; the scope went on to be offered by Elcan as the C79, a version of which was eventually adopted as the M145 Machine Gun Optic used on a number of firearms, especially those from Diemaco (now Colt Canada).

Overview
The main differences of the Colt ACR and the M16A2 is the distinctive furniture. The handguard included a heat-resistant inner lining, vent holes for lightening and air cooling with a thickened ring around the front end to act as a handstop. This was topped with an elevated sight track rib with a white stripe to improve fast target acquisition. The pistol grip was longer and of a different profile than a traditional M16A2, and the rifle featured ambidextrous fire control selectors, removable scope and a streamlined 6 position telescopic stock. Lastly the rifle featured a flash-hider and a Muzzle Brake Compensator (MBC) designed to reduce recoil and compensate for muzzle climb. 

Internally, an oil spring buffer was added to the lower receiver to control the cyclic rate and help reduce felt recoil. Combined with the MBC, these changes reduced felt recoil by 40 per cent compared to a standard M16A2.

Ammunition
The key design change was the use of "duplex rounds", a single cartridge with two bullets in it. Olin Corporation produced three different rounds for testing, the first consisting of two tungsten projectiles in a long-necked case, the second used a standard-length case with two ,  tungsten projectiles, and the final entry was another standard-length case with two  projectiles, one  the other . The latter was eventually selected for submission to the ACR trials. The basic idea of the duplex load is to increase the number of projectiles fired, which is the primary determinant of battlefield casualties.

See also
 AAI ACR
 Steyr ACR
 HK ACR
 Colt Automatic Rifle
 Project Abakan
 Buck and ball
 List of assault rifles

References

Assault rifles of the United States
Colt rifles
Trial and research firearms of the United States
ArmaLite AR-10 derivatives